Paint This with Jerry Yarnell is an educational television show produced by Jerry Yarnell, owner of the Yarnell School of Fine Art. It is broadcast primarily on public television channels. The show focuses mostly on landscape, wildlife, and Western American themes, in the impressionist style. The media used are: acrylics, water miscible oils and watercolors.

Format
Most of the episodes are in groups which cover instructions and demonstrations for a single example painting. All episodes are 30 minutes in length.

External links
 Yarnell School of Fine Art

Television series about art